David Higgins (born February 14, 1947) is an American rower. He competed in the men's coxed eight event at the 1968 Summer Olympics. He graduated from Harvard University and Boston University Law School.

References

External links
 

1947 births
Living people
American male rowers
Olympic rowers of the United States
Rowers at the 1968 Summer Olympics
Sportspeople from Worcester, Massachusetts
Harvard Crimson rowers
Boston University School of Law alumni
Pan American Games medalists in rowing
Pan American Games gold medalists for the United States
Rowers at the 1967 Pan American Games